On 3 March 2022, a suicide bomber killed five people in Sibi, Balochistan, Pakistan and injured six Frontier Corps personnel, 10 officers of the Balochistan Police and three civilians who were taken to Sibi Civil Hospital.

References

2022 murders in Pakistan
March 2022 crimes in Asia
March 2022 events in Pakistan
Mass murder in 2022
Mass murder in Balochistan, Pakistan
Suicide bombings in 2022
Pakistani police officers killed in the line of duty
Suicide bombings in Balochistan, Pakistan
Terrorist incidents in Pakistan in 2022